Karalachuk (Qoralasıq) is a rural locality (a selo) in Semiletovsky Selsoviet, Dyurtyulinsky District, Bashkortostan, Russia. The population was 528 as of 2010. There are 7 streets.

Geography 
Karalachuk is located 21 km southwest of Dyurtyuli (the district's administrative centre) by road. Nizhnemancharovo is the nearest rural locality.

References 

Rural localities in Dyurtyulinsky District